Ana Paula de Araújo Aderaldo Nóbrega (born 17 July 1980) is a Brazilian Christian singer and songwriter.

Biography 
Ana Nóbrega has been influenced by music since her early childhood. She converted at the age of twelve to Christianity.

Ana is a member of the Lagoinha Baptist Church, and she began singing in 2009, in the worship ministry Diante do Trono, led by singer Ana Paula Valadão.

Her first solo album was "Jesus, me Rendo a Ti," which was recorded in 2007.

Discography 
 Studio albums
 Jesus, me Rendo a Ti (2007)
 Nada Temerei (2013)
 Perfeito Amor (2017)
 Acústico (2017)

 Live albums
 Não Me Deixes Desistir (2015)

References

External links

1980 births
Living people
Brazilian Christian religious leaders
Christian music songwriters
Performers of contemporary worship music
Brazilian gospel singers
Brazilian singer-songwriters
People from Fortaleza
Brazilian evangelicals
Brazilian Baptists
21st-century Brazilian singers
21st-century Brazilian women singers
Brazilian women singer-songwriters